The following is a list of governors of the Province of Trieste, from 1918 to 1954. It includes Italian military governor, general civil commissioners and prefects, as well as Allied/Yugoslav military governors of the Free Territory of Trieste (Governors of all Julian March prior to the establishment of the Territory) in the aftermath of World War II.

List

External links
World Statesmen – Italy (Trieste)

Trieste
History of Trieste
Trieste, Governors of the province of
Trieste, Governors of the province of